Anatoliy Mushyk (born 11 August 1981) is a Ukrainian weightlifter. He competed in the men's middle heavyweight event at the 2004 Summer Olympics.

References

1981 births
Living people
Ukrainian male weightlifters
Olympic weightlifters of Ukraine
Weightlifters at the 2004 Summer Olympics
Place of birth missing (living people)